was a Japanese baseball player and manager. He played for the Mainichi Orions, the Hanshin Tigers and the Hiroshima Toyo Carp over the span of an 18 season-long career (1952–1970). 

Yamauchi was the first Japanese professional baseball player to hit 300 home runs, achieving that feat in 1963.  Some of his career stats include 7,702 at bats, 1,218 runs, 2,271 hits, 396 home runs, 1,286 runs batted in, 118 stolen bases, 1,061 walks, and a batting average of .292. 

After retiring as a player in 1970, he went on to become an NPB manager and coach for nearly 30 years.

He was a founding member of the Meikyukai ("The Golden Players Club") in 1978, and was inducted into the Japanese Baseball Hall of Fame in 2002.

Yamauchi died of liver failure in a Tokyo hospital on February 2, 2009. He was 76.

See also 
 List of top Nippon Professional Baseball home run hitters
 List of Nippon Professional Baseball players with 1,000 runs batted in

References

External links
Collection of links

1932 births
2009 deaths
Japanese baseball players
Nippon Professional Baseball outfielders
Mainichi Orions players
Hanshin Tigers players
Hiroshima Toyo Carp players
Managers of baseball teams in Japan
Chiba Lotte Marines managers
Chunichi Dragons managers
People from Ichinomiya, Aichi
Baseball people from Aichi Prefecture
Deaths from liver failure
Nippon Professional Baseball MVP Award winners
Koos Group Whales coaches
Japanese Baseball Hall of Fame inductees